Miraflores Airport  is an airport serving the town of Miraflores, in the Guaviare Department of Colombia. The runway and town are on the east bank of the Vaupés River, a tributary of the Rio Negro River.

See also

Transport in Colombia
List of airports in Colombia

References

External links
OpenStreetMap - Miraflores
OurAirports - Miraflores
SkyVector - Miraflores
FallingRain - Miraflores Airport

Airports in Colombia